The Exorcist is a 1971 horror novel by American writer William Peter Blatty. The book details the demonic possession of eleven-year-old Regan MacNeil, the daughter of a famous actress, and the two priests who attempt to exorcise the demon. Published by Harper & Row, the novel was the basis of a highly successful film adaptation released two years later, whose screenplay was also written and produced by Blatty, and part of The Exorcist franchise.

The novel was inspired by a 1949 case of supposed demonic possession and exorcism that Blatty heard about while he was a student in the class of 1950 at Georgetown University. As a result, the novel takes place in Washington, D.C., near the campus of Georgetown University. In September 2011, the novel was reprinted by HarperCollins to celebrate its fortieth anniversary, with slight revisions made by Blatty as well as interior title artwork by Jeremy Caniglia.

Plot
An elderly Jesuit priest named Father Lankester Merrin is leading an archaeological dig in northern Iraq and is studying ancient relics. After discovering a small statue of the demon Pazuzu (an actual ancient Assyrian demon), a series of omens alerts him to a pending confrontation with a powerful evil, which, unknown to the reader at this point, he has battled before in an exorcism in Africa.

Meanwhile, in Georgetown, a young girl named Regan MacNeil is living with her famous mother, actress Chris MacNeil, who is in Georgetown filming a movie. As Chris finishes her work on the film, Regan begins to become inexplicably ill. After a gradual series of poltergeist-like disturbances in their rented house, for which Chris attempts to find rational explanations, Regan begins to rapidly undergo disturbing psychological and physical changes: she refuses to eat or sleep, becomes withdrawn and frenetic, and increasingly aggressive and violent. Chris initially mistakes Regan's behavior for the result of repressed anger over her parents' divorce and absent father.

Coupled with these events are disturbances at the local Holy Trinity Church which has been desecrated on several occasions potentially linked to Black Mass and is causing local concerns about occult activity.

After several unsuccessful psychiatric and medical treatments, Regan's mother, an atheist, turns to a local Jesuit priest for help as Regan's personality becomes increasingly disturbed and the doctors still cannot find a source. Father Damien Karras, who is currently going through a crisis of faith coupled with the recent loss of his mother, agrees to see Regan as a psychiatrist, but initially resists the notion that it is an actual demonic possession, pointing to advances in science which can explain what was previously assumed to be possession. After a few meetings with the child, now completely inhabited by a diabolical personality claiming to be the devil, he turns to the local bishop for permission to perform an exorcism on the child.

The bishop with whom he consults does not believe Karras is qualified to perform the rites, and appoints the experienced Merrin—who has recently returned to the United States—to perform the exorcism, although he does allow the doubt-ridden Karras to assist him. The lengthy exorcism tests the priests both physically and spiritually. When Merrin, who had previously suffered cardiac arrhythmia, dies during the process, completion of the exorcism ultimately falls upon Father Karras. When he demands that the demonic spirit inhabit him instead of the innocent Regan, the demon seizes the opportunity to possess the priest. Karras heroically surrenders his own life in exchange for Regan's by jumping out of her bedroom window and falling to his death, regaining his faith in God as his last rites are read.

Inspiration
Aspects of the character Father Merrin were based on the British archaeologist Gerald Lankester Harding, who had excavated the caves where the Dead Sea Scrolls had been found and whom Blatty had met in Beirut. Blatty has stated that Harding "was the physical model in my mind when I created the character [of Merrin], whose first name, please note, is Lankester".

Aspects of the novel were inspired by an exorcism performed by the Jesuit priest, Fr. William S. Bowdern, who formerly taught at both St. Louis University and St. Louis University High School. Recent investigative research by freelance journalist Mark Opsasnick indicates that this was the real 1949 exorcism of a young boy from Cottage City, Maryland, whom Opsasnick refers to using the pseudonyms Robbie Mannheim and Roland Doe. The boy was sent to his relative's home on Roanoke Drive in St. Louis where most of the exorcism took place. However, according to the journalist: "There is simply too much evidence that indicates that as a boy he [Roland Doe] had serious emotional problems stemming from his home life. There is not one shred of hard evidence to support the notion of demonic possession".

Blatty refers to the Loudun possessions and the Louviers possessions throughout the story, mostly when Fr. Karras is researching possession and exorcism to present the case to his superiors. He also has one of his characters tell a brief story about an unnamed fraudulent medium who had studied to be a Jesuit priest. This story can be found in Proceedings of the Society for Psychical Research, Vol. 114. 1930, in an article about fraudulent practices by Daniel Dunglas Home.

Achievements
According to research from the Spanish Book Institute, the Spanish-translated version was the eighth-most popular book sold in Spain in 1975.

Editions
Cemetery Dance published a special omnibus edition of The Exorcist and its sequel Legion in October 2010, signed by Blatty. A limited edition of 750 copies (with an additional 52 leatherbound copies), it is now out of print. In September 2011, The Exorcist was re-released as a 40th Anniversary Edition in paperback, hardcover and audiobook editions with differing cover artwork. This new, updated edition featured and revised material, as Blatty writes: "The 40th Anniversary Edition of The Exorcist will have a touch of new material in it as part of an all-around polish of the dialogue and prose. It also features all new cover artwork and interiors by the artist Jeremy Caniglia. First time around I never had the time (meaning the funds) to do a second draft, and this, finally, is it. With forty years to think about it, a few little changes were inevitable — plus one new character in a totally new, very spooky scene. This is the version I would like to be remembered for".

Translations
The novel was translated into many languages including Spanishe and Bengali. The Bengali translation was done by the late popular Bangladeshi novelist and screenwriter Humayun Ahmed.

Adaptations
In 1973, the novel was adapted by Blatty for the film of the same name and directed by William Friedkin with Ellen Burstyn, Max von Sydow, Lee J. Cobb, Jack MacGowran, Jason Miller and Linda Blair. The screenplay for the film won Blatty an Academy Award for Best Adapted Screenplay. In 1974 famed Japanese horror author Kazuo Umezu also created a short comic adaptation of this film.

In February 2014, BBC Radio 4 broadcast a two-part adaptation of the novel by Robert Forrest produced and directed by Gaynor MacFarlane and
starring Robert Glenister as Father Karras, Lydia Wilson as Regan, Teresa Gallagher as Chris MacNeil, Karl Johnson as Detective Kinderman, Bryan Dick as Father Dyer, Alexandra Mathie as The Demon and Ian McDiarmid as Father Merrin.

A stage adaptation of the novel was written by John Pielmeier and premiered at Geffen Playhouse in Los Angeles in July 2012. It was directed by John Doyle and starred Brooke Shields, David Wilson Barnes, Richard Chamberlain, Emily Yetter, Harry Groener, Roslyn Ruff, Manoel Felciano, Tom Nelis, and Stephen Bogardus. The play made its UK premiere at the Birmingham Repertory Theatre in October 2016, co-produced by Bill Kenwright. The new production was directed by Sean Mathias, designed by Anna Fleischle and starred Jenny Seagrove as Chris, Peter Bowles as Merrin and Adam Garcia as Damien.

An upcoming 2023 film currently titled as "Untitled The Exorcist film"  which is also based on The Exorcist (novel) By William Peter Blatty, and will serve as a direct sequel to The Exorcist and will also be a remake/reboot. The film is scheduled to be released by Universal Pictures on October 13, 2023.

See also

 Edward Hughes
 Robbie Mannheim
 Walter Halloran (Fr. Walter Halloran)
 William S. Bowdern (Fr. William Bowdern)

References

Novel
1971 American novels
American horror novels
American novels adapted into films
Arab-American novels
Demon novels
Moroccan American
Harper & Row books
Novels about exorcism
Novels by William Peter Blatty